Mahalia Jackson (1911 – 1972) was the preeminent gospel singer of the 20th century, her career spanning from about 1931 to 1971. She began singing in church as a child in New Orleans, then moved to Chicago as an adolescent and joined Chicago's first gospel group, the Johnson Singers. By demand, she began to sing solo at funerals and political rallies. For about 15 years, Jackson toured a circuit of churches and revivals spreading gospel blues throughout the U.S. working odd jobs to make a living. Her first recordings were made in 1931, produced by the owner of a funeral parlor in Chicago where Jackson often sang, although these have been lost. 

In 1937, Jackson recorded four singles for Decca Records, a company focusing on blues and jazz. The sales were weak and she was asked to record blues and she refused, a decision she made repeatedly throughout her life. Nine years later, she attracted the attention of Apollo Records, a small company catering to black artists and audiences. She recorded four singles for them and again they did not perform well, but the fifth one, "Move On Up a Little Higher", sold two million copies and reached the number two spot on the Billboard charts in 1947, new achievements for gospel music. Based on that success, Jackson released 71 singles in total with Apollo between 1946 and 1954. Her recordings with Decca and Apollo are widely considered defining of gospel blues: they consist of traditional Protestant hymns, spirituals, and songs written by contemporary songwriters such as Thomas A. Dorsey and W. Herbert Brewster. The earliest are sparsely accompanied by piano and organ although Apollo added acoustic guitar, bass, drum, and backup vocalists in the early 1950s. 

Jackson was the first gospel artist to sign with Columbia Records, then the largest recording company in the U.S., in 1954. At Columbia, Jackson released 28 albums between 1955 and 1972, the year of her death. Columbia expanded her repertoire to include songs considered generally inspirational and patriotic which were interspersed with the hymns and gospel songs similar to the ones she sang at Apollo. Though her early records at Columbia had a sound similar to her Apollo records, the music accompanying Jackson at Columbia later included orchestras, electric guitars, backup singers, and drums, the overall effect of which was more closely associated with light pop music. She was marketed similarly to jazz musicians, but her music at Columbia ultimately defied categorization. Nonetheless, Jackson won the first Grammy Award for gospel music in 1961 and the second in 1962. Three of her songs have been included in the Grammy Hall of Fame, including "Move On Up a Little Higher" which was also added to the National Recording Registry in 2005. Jackson received the Recording Academy's Lifetime Achievement Award in 1972. She was a staple on American television in the 1950s and 1960s. She hosted The Mahalia Jackson Show that ran locally in Chicago for a few months in 1955, and appeared as a guest on many national programs. She sang in four films between 1958 and 1964 and appeared in concert halls around the world while making regular appearances at black churches in the U.S. She estimated that she sold 22 million records in her lifetime. Jackson's success ushered the "Golden Age of Gospel" between 1945 and 1965, allowing dozens of gospel music acts to tour and record.

No Label

Decca

Apollo

Columbia

Live albums

Other appearances

Compilations

Notes

References

Citations

Sources 

 Burford, Mark, Mahalia Jackson and the Black Gospel Field, Oxford University Press, (2019).  
 Goreau, Laurraine, Just Mahalia, Baby, World Books, (1975). 
 Whitburn, Joel, Joel Whitburn's Pop Memories: 1890–1954, Record Research, Inc., (1986).

Further reading

 Mahalia Jackson at Discogs
 Mahalia Jackson at AllMusic

Discographies of American artists